Deniz Sağdıç (born 1982 in Mersin, Turkey) is a Turkish artist. She began her art education at Mersin University's Faculty of Fine Arts in 1999. She was included in various projects even as a student. She graduated with a first from the same university in 2003. The young artist who has featured in many international and national projects and ate.

Art exhibitions

Solo exhibitions 
“ Ready ReMade” Çırağan Palace - İstanbul	2019

“ Denim ReMade” Denim Premiere Vision Milano	- Milano 2019

“ Denim ReMade” Hong Kong Denim Festival - Hong Kong 2019

“ Fabric ReMade” Premiere Vision New York - New York 2019

“ Someone” Architects’ Association 1927  - Ankara	2018

“ Denim ReMade” Premiere Vision London - London 2018

“ Denim ReMade” Denim-Days Amsterdam - Amsterdam 2018

“ Denim ReMade” Denim-Days New York - New York 2018

"Ready - ReMade" Vis Sanat  in Istanbul 2016

"The Soul"  Gallery Çankaya, Atatürk Culture Arts And Convention Centre, Mine Art Gallery, Güneş Sigorta Art Gallery in Ankara, Eskişehir, Bodrum, Istanbul 2014 - 2016

"Woman: Ownership" , Renart Gallery,  Iş Bank Art Gallery – Istanbul, Izmir 2013 - 2014 

"Dream And Real", Pinelo Gallery, Gama Gallery – Istanbul 2011 - 2013

Biennials 

6th Çanakkale Biennial	Çanakkale 	2018
6th Thessaloniki Biennial Thessaloniki	2017
Kyoto Art Quake 2015 Kyoto 		2015

Workshops 

“ Denim ReMade” Denim Premiere Vision Milano - Milano 2019

“ Fabric ReMade” Premiere Vision Paris - Paris 2019

“ Denim ReMade” Hong Kong Denim Festival - Hong Kong 2019

“ Denim ReMade” Premiere Vision London - London	2018

“ Denim ReMade” Denim-Days Amsterdam - Amsterdam 2018

“ Denim ReMade” Denim-Days New York - New York 2018

“ LEVI’S x Deniz Sağdıç” Cappadox - Cappadocia 2018

“ Birlikte / Together ” Uniq İstanbul - İstanbul 2017
 
“ Art For Civil Society Dialogue” UNESCO AIAP - Denizli 2015

Group exhibitions 

“ A Selection from Hacı Sabancı Collection” - İstanbul 2019
 
“ ArtWeek Akaretler” Merkur Gallery, Akaretler - İstanbul 2019

“ Artist to Artist” Büyükdere35 Gallery - İstanbul 2019

“ Dualite” DDesign Gallery - İstanbul 2018

“ X” Group Exhibition, Endless Art Taksim - İstanbul 2018

“ Identity: The Sheltered Place” Endless Art Taksim - İstanbul 2017

" YTS Art, Lütfi Kırdar Cong. Centre - İstanbul 2017

“ Women in the Corner” Kare Art Gallery	İstanbul 2017

“ Yaşa(t)mak Aşktır” Historical Ortaköy Orphanage- İstanbul 2017

"Together" Turkmall Gallery – Istanbul 2017

"Lovers" Uniq Gallery – Istanbul 2016

"Day Dreams" Summart Gallery – Istanbul 2016

"Under 40 Age, 40 Artısts" Adnan Saygun Culture Centre- Izmir 2015

"Moonlight I" NK Gallery – Washington 2015

"States Of Material III" Armaggan Gallery - Istanbul 2015

"Wearable Art" Summart Gallery -  Istanbul 2015

"New York Art Expo 2015" Gallery NK – New York - 2015

"Art For Civil Society Dialogue"  IAA Workshop Exhibition  - Istanbul 2015

"Kyoto Art Quake Biennale 2015"  The Museum of Kyoto – Kyoto 2015

"The Ribbon" Galatea Art Gallery – Istanbul 2015

"Ask'a Randevu" The Historical Town Gas Factory Art Centre  - İzmir 2015

References 

https://www.haberturk.com/deniz-sagdic-ile-geri-donusum-sanati-3018381

https://www.oggusto.com/surdurulebilir-yasam/surdurulebilir-sanat-deniz-sagdic

https://www.trt2.com.tr/kultur/yeryuzleri/deniz-sagdic-or-yeryuzleri-or-10-bolum-122558

https://onedio.com/haber/kot-giysileri-inanilmaz-sanat-eserlerine-donusturen-sanatci-deniz-sagdic-ile-tanisin-843299

https://www.canakkalebienali.com/deniz-sagdic/

https://www.milliyet.com.tr/kultur-sanat/hepsini-copten-cikardi-anadolu-ilk-kez-dogdugu-cografya-6602554

https://m.turkiyegazetesi.com.tr/kultursanat/803017.aspx

https://www.artshelp.net/portrait-artist-charts-her-own-path-with-sustainable-art-that-is-accessible-to-everyone/

https://www.inbusiness.com.tr/in-business/2021/09/10/pantolona-degil-tabloya-bak

External links
 Deniz Sağdıç Website
 http://vissanat.com/ 
 https://www.haberturk.com/denizli-haberleri/73486903-kot-parcalari-sanat-eserine-donusturulduyuzlerce-kisi-deniz-sagdici-hayranlikla
 https://ykklondonshowroom.com/2019/12/19/ykk-presents-artist-deniz-sagdic-in-new-exhibition/
 https://onedio.com/haber/kot-giysileri-inanilmaz-sanat-eserlerine-donusturen-sanatci-deniz-sagdic-ile-tanisin-843299
 https://www.trt2.com.tr/kultur/yeryuzleri/deniz-sagdic-or-yeryuzleri-or-10-bolum-122558

1982 births
Turkish artists
Living people
Mersin University alumni